Aculeata is a subclade of Hymenoptera containing ants, bees, and stinging wasps. The name is a reference to the defining feature of the group, which is the modification of the ovipositor into a stinger. However, many members of the group cannot sting, either retaining the ovipositor, or having lost it altogether. A large part of the clade is parasitic.

This group includes all of the eusocial Hymenopterans. It is theorized that the possession of a venomous sting was important in the repeated evolution of eusociality within Hymenoptera.

The oldest aculeates are known from the Late Jurassic Karabastau Formation of Kazakhstan, represented by the family Bethylonymidae, which may be para or polyphyletic.

Classification

The use of the name Aculeata has a long history at the rank of infraorder or division. The Aculeata are a monophyletic, or good natural group, containing all the descendants of a single common ancestor. The Aculeata are therefore maintained as a taxon, either at infraorder or division rank or as an unranked clade.

References

External links
 Tree of Life Web Project: Aculeata
  Bugguide.net: Aculeata
Johnson, B. et al. Phylogenomics resolves evolutionary relationships among ants, bees, and wasps. NCBI

Apocrita
Insect infraorders